The Tirukkuruntantakam is a Tamil Hindu work of literature penned by Tirumangai Alvar, one of the twelve poet-saints of Sri Vaishnavism. The work is a part of a compendium of hymns called the Naalayira Divya Prabandham. The Tirukkuruntantakam consists of 20 hymns and is dedicated to the deity Vishnu. It is written in a Tamil poetic meter known as the tāṇṭakam, in which each line of a stanza consists of more than 26 syllables, comprising quatrains of equal length.

Hymns 

In the Tirukkuruntantakam, the poet-saint includes his mangalasasanam (auspicious felicitations) to Vishnu at a number of Divya Desams, the sacred temples of the deity. In a number of hymns, he laments the time that he had spent in the pursuit of transient pleasures rather than in religious devotion. He also regards dwelling on Vishnu and his kalyana gunas (auspicious attributes) to be his food and drink.

Tirumangai Alvar discusses the dependency of own's soul on God to achieve moksha, which he regards ends earthly suffering.

The fifth hymn of this work compares the sweetness of the author's deity to the consumption of sugarcane juice:

A hymn compares the deeds of Hanuman in the Ramayana for Rama with his own dedication to his deity:

See also 

 Tirunetuntantakam
 Tiruvelukkutrirukkai
 Periya Tirumoli

References 

Naalayira Divya Prabandham

External links 
Tirukkuruntantakam (Tamil)
Vaishnava texts
Sri Vaishnavism
Tamil Hindu literature